Gyula "Jules" Turnauer, was a former Hungarian football manager of Belgian and German teams, including the Belgium national football team.

Managerial career
Even though Turnauer contributed to Belgian football history by managing the squad of Lierse SK that won the Belgian Championship in 1932 for its first time, and leading the Belgium national football team, little is known about his total managerial career and his life in general. Many years after having managed Belgium's national team during three internationals, he trained ROC Charleroi and FSV Frankfurt for short periods.

Managerial achievements
Lierse SK
Belgian First Division
Winner (1): 1931–32

Belgium national football team
3 matches as head coach

References

1899 births
Year of death missing
Hungarian football managers
Expatriate football managers in Belgium
Hungarian expatriate football managers
Belgium national football team managers